Midt-Telemark is a municipality in the traditional and electoral district Telemark in Vestfold og Telemark county, Norway. The municipality was established on 1 January 2020 when the former municipalities of Bø and Sauherad combined.

There are two valleys: Sauherad including the basin Heddalsvassdraget to the East, and Seljordsvassdraget including the villages Nes and Bø to the west.

Notable people

References

 
Municipalities of Vestfold og Telemark
2020 establishments in Norway